Harry Elmer Malcolm (November 25, 1905 – September 15, 1987) was a professional American football player for the Frankford Yellow Jackets. He attended Washington & Jefferson College and the Indiana University of Pennsylvania.

See also
 1929 Frankford Yellow Jackets season

Notes

External links
 

Players of American football from Pennsylvania
People from Indiana County, Pennsylvania
Frankford Yellow Jackets players
Washington & Jefferson College alumni
Washington & Jefferson Presidents football players
Indiana University of Pennsylvania alumni
IUP Crimson Hawks football players
1905 births
1987 deaths